The Mark P. Jones House is a historic house at Center and Fir Streets in Searcy, Arkansas.  It is a single story structure, with a wood frame clad in brick.  It is basically rectangular, but has an asymmetrical arrangement of gables, projections, and recesses characteristic of the English Revival.  It was built about 1928, and is a well-preserved local example of the style.  It was for many years home to Mark P. Jones, a long-serving mayor of the city.

The house was listed on the National Register of Historic Places in 1991.

See also
National Register of Historic Places listings in White County, Arkansas

References

Houses on the National Register of Historic Places in Arkansas
Houses completed in 1928
Houses in Searcy, Arkansas
National Register of Historic Places in Searcy, Arkansas
1928 establishments in Arkansas